Johnny Aba (born 3 March 1956) is a Papua New Guinean professional feather/super feather/lightweight boxer of the 1970s and 1980s who won the Papua New Guinea featherweight title, Papua New Guinea lightweight title, and Commonwealth super featherweight title, and was a challenger for the World Boxing Association (WBA) World featherweight title, against Eusebio Pedroza, his professional fighting weight varied from , i.e. featherweight to , i.e. lightweight.

Biography
Aba was born in Roravana on Bougainville Island

References

External links

1956 births
Featherweight boxers
Lightweight boxers
Living people
Papua New Guinean male boxers
People from the Autonomous Region of Bougainville
Super-featherweight boxers